The 2006 Idaho gubernatorial election was held on November 7, 2006. Incumbent Governor Jim Risch succeeded Dirk Kempthorne, who resigned May 26 to become Secretary of the Interior. Risch served as governor until the end of the term, but had committed to a reelection campaign for Lieutenant Governor before Kempthorne's appointment and subsequent resignation.

This was the last time that a Democrat won over 40% of the vote in Idaho.

Republican primary

Candidates
Dan Adamson, businessman and attorney
Walter Bayes, perennial candidate
Jack Alan Johnson
C.L. "Butch" Otter, U.S. Representative and former Lieutenant Governor of Idaho

Results

Democratic primary

Candidates
Jerry Brady, newspaper publisher and 2002 Democratic nominee for governor
Lee Chaney, laborer

General Election

Candidates

Marvin Richardson (unendorsed Constitution) – organic strawberry farmer  and sawmill owner
Jerry Brady (Democratic), newspaper publisher and 2002 Democratic nominee for governor
Ted Dunlap (Libertarian)
Butch Otter (Republican), U.S. Congressman, former Lieutenant Governor of Idaho

Controversy
A candidate legally named Marvin Pro-Life Richardson filed suit to force the state to print his full legal on the ballots, as filed in campaign paperwork. The Secretary of State stated that ballots themselves are supposed to be neutral, not political billboards, and declined the request.  In September 2006 he changed his legal name to simply "Pro-Life" in an attempt to force the issue.  However, the ballots went to the printer naming "Marvin Richardson" as the Constitution Party candidate.  The party later disavowed his candidacy resulting in a candidate without a name, and without a party, appearing on the ballot.

Predictions

Results

References

External links
Brady for Governor
Otter for Governor
Idaho Secretary of State – Elections

Gubernatorial
2006
Idaho